Agrotis antica is a species of cutworm or dart moth in the family Noctuidae. It is found in North America.

The MONA or Hodges number for Agrotis antica is 10660.1.

References

Further reading

 
 
 

Agrotis
Articles created by Qbugbot
Moths described in 2004